Sean Ashby is a singer, songwriter and guitarist who has performed with Sarah McLachlan since 1996. He also played and recorded with Delerium, Ginger (formerly Grapes of Wrath), Wild Strawberries, Mae Moore, D of Run-D.M.C. and many others. Ashby formed the group Jack Tripper in 1999.

Recorded two albums, Jack Tripper and 9 Easy Pieces. Released solo album "Brass and Gold" in 2008.

Discography
 2008  Brass and Gold

See also

Music of Canada
Canadian rock
List of Canadian musicians

References

External links
Sean Ashby Official website
Electronic press kit from sonicbids.com

Year of birth missing (living people)
Living people
Place of birth missing (living people)
Canadian guitarists
Musicians from Vancouver